The Grey Zone is a 1997 Italian drama film written and directed by Franco Bernini.  It entered into the competition at the International Critics' Week of the 50th Cannes Film Festival. The film won the Grolla d'oro for best screenplay.

Cast 
 Claudio Amendola: Dario Campisi 
 Francesca Neri: Claudia 
 Enzo De Caro: Giulio  
 Toni Bertorelli: Judge Consoli 
 Barbara Cupisti: Teresa
 Massimo De Francovich: Prof. Sembriani  
 Teresa Saponangelo:  Patient

References

External links

1997 films
Italian drama films
1997 drama films
1997 directorial debut films
1990s Italian films
Fandango (Italian company) films